Fernandez's method (FB) in computer science and operations research, is a method which is used in the multiprocessor scheduling algorithm.  It is actually used to improve the quality of the lower bounding schemes which are adopted by branch and bound algorithms for solving multiprocessor scheduling problem. Fernandez's problem derives a better lower bound than HF, and propose a quadratic-time algorithm from calculating the bound. It is known that a straightforward calculation of FB takes O time, since it must examine O combinations each of which takes O time in the worst case.

Further reading
A Comparison of List Scheduling for Parallel Processing Systems

References

Optimization algorithms and methods